Pterotaenia rivelloides is a species of ulidiid or picture-winged fly in the genus Platyeuxesta of the family Ulidiidae.

Distribution
Argentina.

References

Ulidiidae
Diptera of South America
Endemic fauna of Argentina
Taxa named by Émile Blanchard
Insects described in 1967